Sinop Futebol Clube is a Brazilian association football club based in the city of Sinop in the state of Mato Grosso.

History
On January 16, 1977, Sinop Futebol Clube was founded. The club was eliminated in the First Round by Santos in the Copa do Brasil in 1999 and in the Second Round by São Paulo in the Copa do Brasil in 2000. The club is famous for being the first professional club of Rogério Ceni.

Achievements
 Campeonato Mato-Grossense:
 Winners (3): 1990, 1998, 1999
 Campeonato Mato-Grossense Second Division:
 Winners (2): 1988, 2012

Stadium

They currently play in their home stadium, the Estádio Municipal Gigante do Norte, which has a capacity of 25,000.

Mascot
The club's mascot is a rooster.

References

 
Association football clubs established in 1977
Football clubs in Mato Grosso
1977 establishments in Brazil